Thierry Delubac (born 23 March 1963) is a French former racing driver.

References

1963 births
Living people
French racing drivers
International Formula 3000 drivers
Place of birth missing (living people)
20th-century French people